Larutia kecil is a species of skink. It is endemic to Sarawak, Malaysian Borneo, where it is known from Gunung Penrissen (=Mt. Penrissen). It is a small species within its genus, reaching  in snout–vent length.

References

kecil
Reptiles of Borneo
Reptiles of Malaysia
Endemic fauna of Borneo
Endemic fauna of Malaysia
Reptiles described in 2019
Taxa named by Ibuki Fukuyama
Taxa named by Tsutomu Hikida
Taxa named by Mohamad Yazid Hossman
Taxa named by Kanto Nishikawa